Dobroszyce  is a village in Oleśnica County, Lower Silesian Voivodeship, in south-western Poland. It is the seat of the administrative district (gmina) called Gmina Dobroszyce.

The village has a population of 2,376.

Between 1663 and 1928 it had town rights.

During World War II, from 1940 to 1942, the Germans operated the Oflag VIII-C prisoner-of-war camp for French, Belgian and Dutch officers and orderlies in the village. Some Dutch POWs managed to escape from the camp.

There is a railway station in Dobroszyce.

Sports
The local football club is Dąb Dobroszyce. It competes in the lower leagues.

References

Villages in Oleśnica County